Ocean Springs High School is an IB-certified public high school in Ocean Springs, Mississippi. The school serves students in grades 9–12 and is part of the Ocean Springs School District.

In addition to Ocean Springs it serves Gulf Park Estates and a portion of Gautier.

Athletics
The Ocean Springs High School sports team mascot is the Greyhound. OSHS' sports teams include football, track and field, swimming, cross country, fast and slow pitch softball, soccer, volleyball, basketball, golf, tennis, and baseball. It is the first high school in Mississippi to have a varsity wrestling team.

Notable alumni

 DeAndre Brown, former professional football player
 Garrett Crochet, professional baseball pitcher, Chicago White Sox
 Richard Dickson, former professional football player, Detroit Lions 
 Raul Gonzalez, soccer player for the Puerto Rico national team
 Irving Spikes, former professional football player, Miami Dolphins

References

External links

Schools in Jackson County, Mississippi
Public high schools in Mississippi